Robin Hood is a fictional character, a comic book outlaw published by DC Comics. Robin Hood debuted in New Adventure Comics vol. 1 #23 (January 1938), and was created by Sven Elven. The character is based on the legendary archer Robin Hood whose earliest recorded literary appearance was in William Langland's 14th century narrative poem, Piers Plowman. The character of Robin Hood was made popular by Howard Pyle's 19th century novel The Merry Adventures of Robin Hood.

Publication history
The DC Comics version of Robin Hood first appeared in New Adventure Comics vol. 1, #23 (January 1938). Robin Hood's debut in January 1938 was one of the earliest appearances of a recurring character in a DC Comics title, and predates Superman's debut in June 1938.

The character then shows up in Robin Hood Tales #1 (February 1956) published by Quality Comics; the series was later bought and published by National Periodical Publications (later known as DC Comics) starting with Robin Hood Tales #7 (February 1957).

Fictional character biography
The mainstream DC Comics version of Robin Hood is Robert Fitzooth, the 12th century Earl of Huntingdon. Fitzooth a veteran soldier, discovers the ruins of his family castle upon returning from the Crusades. He later learns that Prince John has usurped the throne of his brother, Richard the Lionheart, Prince John razed the elder Earl of Huntingdon's castle and confiscated his lands because he supported King Richard. A suspicious Richard had sent Fitzooth back to England ahead of his return from the Crusades. Robert Fitzooth was given Richard's royal ring, and empowered to act on his behalf. Fitzooth loses the ring to Prince John's machinations and uses his military training to found a rebel movement based in Sherwood Forest, to oppose Prince John's rule and retrieve the royal seal. He takes his namesake "Robin" from a small bird, a robin he sees bravely opposing a falcon. The surname "Hood" from a green hood was given to him by the Countess Marian, otherwise known as Lady Marian or Maid Marian.

More Fun Comics

In More Fun Comics #82 Speedy and Green Arrow use "time pills" confiscated from a mad scientist named Professor Wurm to travel back to the 12th century era of Robin Hood. They discover that Robin Hood has been framed for murder by Sir Guy of Gisbourne; Green Arrow clears Robin's name, and later returns to the present day with Speedy.

Detective Comics

In Detective Comics vol. 1 #116, Batman and Robin meet and rescue Robin Hood. Batman also takes part in an archery tournament sponsored by the Sheriff of Nottingham, all thanks to Professor Carter Nichols and his "time hypnosis" technology.

World's Finest Comics
Green Arrow travels through time again, and switches places with Robin Hood in World's Finest Comics vol. 1 #40.

Wonder Woman

Wonder Woman traveled back in time twice to meet Robin Hood using the "Amazon time-and-space transformer", in Wonder Woman vol. 1 #82, and then later in Wonder Woman vol. 1 #94.

Adventure Comics
In Adventure Comics vol. 1 #264, while visiting Sherwood Forest, Green Arrow and Speedy discover a time machine in a secret World War II laboratory. They both travel back in time where Green Arrow temporarily takes the place of an injured Robin Hood. He helps the Merry Men fight the Sheriff of Nottingham, and rescues Maid Marian. At adventure's conclusion the time machine returns Green Arrow and Speedy to the present.

Rip Hunter, Time Master

Rip Hunter and a pretty female stowaway meet Richard I of England, as well as Robin Hood, Maid Marian and the Merry Men in Rip Hunter, Time Master #22.

Superman's Girl Friend, Lois Lane

In Superman's Girl Friend, Lois Lane #22, Robin Hood appears in an imaginary story where he meets Lois Lane and Superman. The story is later reprinted in Superman's Girl Friend, Lois Lane #74.

Justice League of America

In Justice League of America #101 the Seven Soldiers of Victory, the Justice Society of America, and the Justice League of America all become lost in time while battling the Nebula Man. In the story Green Arrow once again stands in for an injured Robin Hood, he is captured by the Sheriff of Nottingham but later rescued by members of the JLA and JSA.

Other versions
 Writer Michael Jan Friedman and artist Luke McDonnell launched a retelling of the Robin Hood legend with Outlaws: The Legend of the Man Called Hood #1 (September 1991). Outlaws was an eight issue mini-series which re-imagined the legend set in a future, post-apocalyptic alternate time, akin to the future depicted in films such as Mad Max.
 Robin Hood and his band appear in Fables #4 (October 2002). Along with other folk heroes in the Vertigo Comics series, they give their lives to buy time for the last ship to flee to the mundane world.

In other media

Super Friends
 Robin Hood was mentioned by Green Arrow more than once in the season one episode "Gulliver's Gigantic Goof".
 Robin Hood was seen on a movie poster in Crime Alley in the final season episode "The Fear".

Arrowverse
On the Arrow television series, Green Arrow is referred to as Robin Hood a number of times, and is mentioned in Supergirl episode "Crisis on Earth-X".

References

External links
Cosmic Teams: Robin Hood
Green Arrow Index
Boldoutlaw.com: Robin Hood Tales
Comicvine: New Adventure Comics
Comicvine: Robin Hood Tales
Comicvine: Brave and the Bold - Robin Hood
Fanzing.com: Fanzing #39
Rip Hunter Index

Mythology in DC Comics
Golden Age superheroes
Comics by Bob Haney
Comics characters introduced in 1938
DC Comics military personnel
Fictional archers
Fictional swordfighters in comics

Robin Hood
Vigilante characters in comics